Stephen Decatur Hatch (1839–1894) was a prominent late-19th century architect who was responsible for a number of historically or architecturally significant buildings in Manhattan, New York City and elsewhere.  He primarily designed commercial buildings.

Early life, family and education

Stephen Hatch was born in Swanton, Vermont. His father was an inventor.

Career
Hatch relocated to New York City, finding employment as a construction inspector. He joined the busy architectural firm of John B. Snook in 1860 as a draftsman. 

Hatch left the Snook firm around 1864 to start his own practice. He became the architect of the U.S. War Department, responsible for construction of military posts in New York. His practice began to flourish in 1868.

Personal life and demise

Hatch died in 1894, during the construction of an extension to the headquarters building of the New York Life Insurance Company.

Works
Manhattan
213-215 Water Street – warehouse, built 1868 for A.A. Thompson & Co., now part of South Street Seaport Museum, within the South Street Seaport Historic District
118 East 18th Street – built 1868
Gilsey House Hotel – 1200 Broadway, built 1869–1871, converted to residential use 1980, a New York City landmark (1979)

836-838 Broadway – built 1876-1877
Robbins & Appleton Building – manufacturing, built 1879–1880, a New York City landmark (1979)
Schepp Building – warehouse, 45-53 Hudson Street, built 1880, within the Tribeca North Historic District
165 Duane Street – lofts, built 1881, within the Tribeca West Historic District
Murray Hill Hotel – Park Avenue between 40th and 41st Streets, built 1884, razed 1947
U.S. Army Building – also known as 3 New York Plaza, Water & Whitehall Streets, offices, built 1886
168 Duane Street – warehouse, built 1886–1887, within the Tribeca West Historic District, Dutch Revival style 
Manhattan Savings Institution – also known as Bleecker Tower, 644 Broadway, built 1889–1891, within the NoHo Historic District 
Fleming Smith Warehouse – 451-453 Washington Street, built 1891–1892, a New York City landmark (1978)
Roosevelt Building – lofts, 839-841 Broadway, built 1893
Former New York Life Insurance Company Building – also known as the Clock Tower Building, offices, 346 Broadway, built 1894–1895, completed by McKim, Mead & White, a New York City landmark (1987) and on the National Register of Historic Places (1982)
United States Custom House (now the Federal Hall National Memorial) and the American Surety Building, both located in lower Manhattan.

Elsewhere
Methodist Episcopal Church – Madison, New Jersey, built 1870, on the National Register of Historic Places (2008)
Jubilee Hall – Fisk University, Nashville, Tennessee, built 1876, a National Historic Landmark (1974)
Laclede Building – St. Louis, Missouri, built 1888
Eisenhower Executive Office Building, Rooms 231 & 232 – Washington, D.C., office suite for the U.S. Secretary of War, completed March 1888
Designed State Capitol building in Providence, Rhode Island.

References

External links

1839 births
1894 deaths
Architects from New York City
Architects from Vermont
Cast-iron architecture in New York City
19th-century American architects